Patrick O'Keeffe may refer to:

 Patrick O'Keeffe (politician) (1881–1973), Irish Sinn Féin politician
 Patrick O'Keeffe (writer) (born 1964), Irish American short story writer